Leonardo Latini (born 14 June 1974 in Terni) is an Italian politician and lawyer.

He is a member of the right-wing populist party Lega Nord. Latini was elected Mayor of Terni on 24 June 2018 and took office on 26 June.

See also
2018 Italian local elections
List of mayors of Terni

References

External links
 
 

1974 births
Living people
Mayors of Terni
Lega Nord politicians